Penicillium kongii is a terverticillate species of the genus of Penicillium which was isolated from plant leaves in China.

References

kongii
Fungi described in 2013